Université Paris Lumières is an association of universities and higher education institutions (ComUE) for institutions of higher education, research and culture in the Île-de-France (including Paris) region of France.

The association was created as a ComUE according to the 2013 Law on Higher Education and Research (France), effective December 29, 2014.

Members 
Founding members of Université Paris Lumières are:
Paris Nanterre University
University of Paris 8 Vincennes-Saint-Denis
Centre national de la recherche scientifique (CNRS)

The ComUE also has thirteen associate members:
Archives nationales (France)
Bibliothèque nationale de France
CEDIAS - Musée social
 Centre Pompidou
 Collège international de philosophie
 Crédit municipal de Paris
Louis Lumière College
 INA - Institut national de l'audiovisuel
 INS-HEA
 La maison des cultures du Monde
 Cité nationale de l'histoire de l'immigration
Musée du quai Branly
 Pôle Sup'93

See also
Institut national supérieur de formation et de recherche pour l'éducation des jeunes handicapés et les enseignements adaptés

References

External links 
 Université Paris Lumières website

Universities in Île-de-France
2014 establishments in France